Lake Woahink Seaplane Base  is a public seaplane base located at Woahink Lake, 4 miles (6.4 km) south of the city of Florence in Lane County, in the U.S. state of Oregon.

External links

Airports in Lane County, Oregon
Seaplane bases in the United States